Wieprzowe Jezioro  is a village in the administrative district of Gmina Tomaszów Lubelski, within Tomaszów Lubelski County, Lublin Voivodeship, in eastern Poland.

References

Wieprzowe Jezioro